The men's discus throw field event at the 1972 Olympic Games took place on September 1 and 2. Twenty-nine athletes from 18 nations competed. The maximum number of athletes per nation had been set at 3 since the 1930 Olympic Congress. After the retirement of four-time Olympic champion Al Oerter, this was an event that was open to everyone. The favorite was two-time Olympic medalist and 1971 European Champion Ludvík Daněk. Daněk won, completing a full set of three different medals in the event; it was Czechoslovakia's first gold medal in the men's discus throw. Daněk was the second man (after Oerter) to win three medals in the event. Jay Silvester of the United States took silver, keeping alive the American streak of medaling in every appearance of the event (though the nation's five-Games gold medal streak ended). Ricky Bruch earned Sweden's first medal in the men's discus throw with his bronze.

Background

This was the 17th appearance of the event, which is one of 12 athletics events to have been held at every Summer Olympics. Returning finalists from the 1968 Games were bronze medalist (and 1964 silver medalist) Ludvík Daněk of Czechoslovakia, fourth-place finisher (and 1964 finalist) Hartmut Losch of East Germany, fifth-place finisher (and 1964 finalist) Jay Silvester of the United States, eighth-place finisher Ricky Bruch of Sweden, ninth-place finisher Hein-Direck Neu of West Germany, eleventh-place finisher Ferenc Tégla of Hungary, and twelfth-place finisher Robin Tait of New Zealand. Daněk was favored, though Silvester and Bruch (who shared the world record) were also serious contenders.

India and Saudi Arabia each made their debut in the men's discus throw. The United States made its 17th appearance, having competed in every edition of the Olympic men's discus throw to date.

Competition format

The competition used the two-round format introduced in 1936, with the qualifying round completely separate from the divided final. In qualifying, each athlete received three attempts; those recording a mark of at least 59.00 metres advanced to the final. If fewer than 12 athletes achieved that distance, the top 12 would advance. The results of the qualifying round were then ignored. Finalists received three throws each, with the top eight competitors receiving an additional three attempts. The best distance among those six throws counted.

Records

Prior to the competition, the existing world and Olympic records were as follows.

For the first time since 1920, no new Olympic record was set in the event.

Schedule

All times are Central European Time (UTC+1)

Results

All throwers reaching  and the top 12 including ties advanced to the finals. All qualifiers are shown in blue. All distances are listed in metres.

Qualifying

Final

References

External links
Official report

Men's discus throw
Discus throw at the Olympics
Men's events at the 1972 Summer Olympics